The Discovery Channel Young Scientist Challenge (DCYSC) is the former name of the youth science and engineering competition now known as the Discovery Education 3M Young Scientist Challenge sponsored by Discovery Education and 3M for middle school students in the United States. It was created in 1999 as an engineering research and exhibit competition for students in grades 5 through 8 and was sponsored primarily by Discovery Communications, Society for Science and the Public, and Elmer's Glue. Competitors originally qualified for DCYSC by entering in an International Science and Engineering affiliated science fair and nominated by a teacher or professional (also see Intel International Science and Engineering Fair).

The judging criteria challenged students to complete an application that included several essays. The essays were then evaluated for communication abilities by DCYSC judges who selected 400 semi-finalists. The judging panel also selected 40 finalists who received an all-expense-paid trip to Washington D.C. to compete in the final competition. The finals were composed of two parts. The first was a research presentation, accounting for 20% of the total score, held at the Smithsonian's National Museum of Natural History, the National Academy of Sciences, or another academic national association that varied from year to year. The second part was a series of six science-related challenges that took place at the National Institutes of Health or the University of Maryland. Each challenge was concluded with some type of presentation (e.g., a radio show, a TV show, or a news conference) worth 10% of the students' total score. Students also presented a simple science experiment, known as a Whelmer, in front of cameras for 15% of their score. The remaining 5% came from teamwork, as the finalists were split into eight colored teams consisting of five members each for the science challenges.

The contest's name change to the Discovery Education 3M Young Scientist Challenge occurred in 2008. Students no longer have to be nominated and now submit a 1-2 minute video clip as their form of entry.

References 

https://www.youngscientistlab.com/challenge/about, Discovery Education 3M Young Scientist Challenge – How it began

External links 
 2003 Award Honorees, including DCYSC mentors and finalists, MIT Lincoln Laboratory

Awards established in 1999
Science competitions
Youth science